The Kleiner Auersberg is a mountain, in the Bavarian part of the Rhön mountains. It is situated five kilometres southwest of the centre of Wildflecken in the county of Bad Kissingen on the  watershed between the Sinn and Kleiner Sinn.

The Kleiner Auersberg is only partly wooded and its summit is thus a good viewing point. In good visibility the views extend as far as the Kreuzberg in the east, Dreistelzberg and  Spessart in the southwest as far as the Vogelsberg in the northwest. In very good visibility the Taunus and the skyscrapers of Frankfurt am Main are visible.

The Kleiner Auersberg lies within the Wildflecken Training Area, established in 1938. The entire terrain is a military out-of-bounds area. The only opportunity for civilians to climb the Kleiner Auersberg is on the two Volkswandertage ("people's walking days"), which take place annually on a summer weekend. Due to the good views, usually one of the prescribed routes leads to the summit. A good two kilometres east-northeast rises the slightly higher and densely wooded Großer Auersberg. Neither should be confused with the Auersberg near Hilders in the Hessian part of the Rhön.

See also
List of mountains and hills of the Rhön

External links 
Information about the Volkswandertage at www.wildflecken.de 
 Panorama from the Kleiner Auersberg at www.panorama-photo.net

Mountains under 1000 metres
Mountains of Bavaria
Mountains and hills of the Rhön
Wildflecken Training Area